L'Altra is an indie rock/electronic/chamber pop band from Chicago, Illinois.

Bio
L'Altra is an indie rock/electronic band consisting of principle songwriters Joseph Desler Costa and Lindsay Anderson joined by drummer Charles Rumback and guitarist Alessandro Baris.  The band is currently split between Chicago, IL and Brooklyn, NY.

History
L'Altra formed in 1999 in Chicago with original members Ken Dyber, Eben English, Lindsay Anderson, and Joseph Desler Costa. Marc Hellner of Pulseprogramming was also a regular contributor. The band's name is Italian  or Català and means "the [feminine] other" or "other woman.". The band released an EP and two records with Aesthetics Records before English and Dyber left the band. The band continued with Costa and Anderson as a songwriting duo and relying on a loose collective of Chicago based musicians and friends.  Their 2002 release In the Afternoon  featured a guest appearance from avant-cellist Fred Lonberg-Holm. The band continued to tour with members Kevin Duneman and W.W. Lowman, taking the place of the departed rhythm section. 
In 2005 L'Altra moved to Hefty Records and teamed up with Telefon Tel Aviv's Joshua Eustis who produced and recorded the band's album Different Days. Lindsay Anderson later released a solo album called If (Minty Fresh) while Joseph Costa released a solo effort Lighter Subjects-Costa Music (Stilll) in 2008.  In 2008, after a few years hiatus,  Lindsay and Joseph began touring again and started to work on new material.  The band signed with longtime friend Jesus Llorente's Madrid based label, Acuarela Discos, in 2010 and subsequently released their 4th studio album, Telepathic, in March 2011.  In 2012 the band signed to Saint Marie Records and plans to release a deluxe edition of Telepathic in spring 2012.

Discography 
Albums
S/T EP (Aesthetics), 1999.
Music of a Sinking Occasion (Aesthetics), 2000.
In The Afternoon (Aesthetics), 2002.
Ouletta 7" (Aesthetics), 2002.
Different Days (Hefty Records), 2005.
Bring On Happiness EP (Hefty Records), 2005.
Lindsay Anderson 'If' (Lindsay solo) (Minty Fresh), 2007.
Costa Music 'Lighter Subjects' (Joseph solo) (Stilll, IsCollageCollective), 2008
Winter Loves Summer Sun, Single (Crooked House), 2010
Telepathic (Acuarela Records), 2011
Deluxe Edition'Telepathic (Saint Marie Records Records), 2012

Tracks Appear On
Yeti One                                         Yeti Publishing LLC   2000
Compiled                                               Aesthetics           2001
Domino 2001                                            Ancienne Belgique   2001
POPvolume#2                                         POPnews           2001
VPRO De Avonden XMAS 2001                              Amekbelevchrist VPRO   2001
Acuarela Songs 2                                       Acuarela Discos   2003
Sampler 3                                              Hang Up           2003
Hefty 10 Digest + Prefuse73Mixtape                  Hefty Records           2006
Hefty 10th Anniversary                                 Hefty Records            2006

References

External links 

Electronic music groups from Illinois
American pop music groups
Musical groups from Chicago